Featherstitch or feather stitch and Cretan stitch or faggoting stitch are embroidery techniques made of open, looped stitches worked alternately to the right and left of a central rib.  Fly stitch is categorized with the featherstitches.

Applications
Feather stitch is a decorative stitch which is usually accompanied with embellishments. Cretan stitch is characteristic of embroidery of Crete and the surrounding regions.  

Open Cretan stitch or faggoting is used in making open decorative seams and to attach insertions.

Feather stitch embroidery arose in England in the 19th century for decorating smock-frocks.  It is also used to decorate the joins in crazy quilting.  It is related to (and probably derives from) the older buttonhole stitch and chain stitch.

Variants
Common variants of featherstitch include:
Basic featherstitch
Long-armed featherstitch
Double featherstitch
Closed featherstitch
Chained feather stitch
Cloud stitch

Stitch gallery

Looped stitches
Other looped stitches include:
Cretan stitch or Open Cretan stitch or faggoting stitch
Closed Cretan stitch
Fishbone stitch
Fly stitch, a filling stitch made of single, detached tacked loops.
Loop stitch
Scroll stitch

Gallery

See also

Cross-stitch
Embroidery stitch

Notes

References

Caulfield, S.F.A., and B.C. Saward, The Dictionary of Needlework, 1885.
Christie, Mrs. Archibald (Grace Christie), Embroidery and Tpestry Weaving, London, John Hogg, 1912, online at Project Gutenberg
Enthoven, Jacqueline: The Creative Stitches of Embroidery, Van Norstrand Rheinhold, 1964, 
Reader's Digest, Complete Guide to Needlework. The Reader's Digest Association, Inc. (March 1992). 

Embroidery stitches